As the new medium of cinema was beginning to replace theater as a source of large-scale spectacle, the Little Theatre Movement developed in the United States around 1912. The Little Theatre Movement served to provide experimental centers for the dramatic arts, free from the standard production mechanisms used in prominent commercial theaters.  In several large cities, beginning with Chicago, Boston, Seattle, and Detroit, companies formed to produce more intimate, non-commercial, non-profit-centered, and reform-minded entertainments.

History

Conventional theater in 19th-century America
Sensational melodramas had entertained theatre audiences since the mid-19th century, drawing larger and larger audiences. These types of formulaic works could be produced over and over again in splendid halls in big cities and by touring companies in smaller ones. During the last decades of the century, producers and playwrights began to create narratives dealing with social problems, albeit usually on a sensational level. While not yet totally free of melodramatic elements, plays reflecting a style more associated with realism gradually emerged. During a secret meeting in 1895, the owners of most of the theatres across America organized into a Theatrical Syndicate "to control competition and prices." This group, which included all major producers, "effectively stifled dramatic experimentation for many years" in search of greater profits. Nevertheless, by the second decade of the 20th century, pure melodrama, with its typed characters and exaggerated plots, had become the province of motion pictures.

Little Theaters of Chicago
Chicago's philanthropists and arts patrons Arthur T. and Mary Aldis established an artists' colony called The Compound in Lake Forest, Illinois. In 1910, Mary founded there the Aldis Playhouse, "a predecessor to the 'little theater' movement." The Hull House settlement theatre group, founded by Jane Addams and Ellen Gates Starr, was the first to perform several plays by Galsworthy, Ibsen, and Shaw in Chicago. Maurice Browne, director and co-founder of the Chicago Little Theatre with Ellen Van Volkenburg, responding to having often been called the founder of the Little Theatre Movement, instead credited Hull House director Laura Dainty Pelham with being the "true founder of the 'American Little Theatre Movement.'" Nevertheless, Browne and Van Volkenburg's company had, as the first little theatre to use the term, provided the movement with its name and inspired the creation in 1914 of Margaret Anderson's influential Chicago periodical The Little Review.

Alice Gerstenberg, an original member of the Chicago Little Theatre, expanded the movement to include children, founding the Chicago Junior League Theatre for Children in 1921. Gerstenberg was also producer and president of The Playwrights' Theatre of Chicago, 1922–1945. She was active in the Alice Gerstenberg Experimental Theatre Workshop in the 1950s and the Alice Gerstenberg Theatre in the 1960s, which helped to cultivate the legacy of the Little Theatre Movement of the early 20th century.

In 1912, two theatre groups were formed, the Toy Theatre in Boston and the Chicago Little Theatre; these events often being cited as the official start of the Little Theatre Movement in the United States. Continuing to react against commercialism, amateur companies began to write and produce their own works as well as new plays from Europe that had been ignored by the syndicates. A wide variety of experimental groups, clubs, and settlement houses undertook to reform the theater, bringing more inwardly directed plays to a wider public audience. New forms of drama, some influenced by or parodying the new science of psychoanalysis, began to be presented in smaller venues, many converted from other uses into makeshift theatres. The new groups began to experiment with new forms of storytelling, acting styles, dialogue, and mise-en-scene. This experimentation, influenced by European models, ranged from an ultra-detailed naturalism to, by the early 1920s, a wildly provocative expressionism, part of a new stagecraft. Women were pervasive throughout these companies, although their efforts were often belittled, dismissed, or undervalued. Several theaters also sprang up during this period. The Wee Playhouse reading theater in Alfred, New York, traces its origin to Fall 1920 and still holds meetings today, making it probably the oldest continuous reading theater in the country.

Pasadena Community Playhouse
The movement achieved high-water marks in artistic significance, community involvement, and international recognition with the Pasadena Community Playhouse. Originally a community theatre, the Playhouse boasted at its peak capacity six stages, each featuring a new production every two weeks, making it, for most of the early 20th century, the world's most prolific theatrical production organization. This palatial venue was, at the time of its construction in 1925, the largest theatre complex west of Chicago. The organization was able to complete many projects beyond the scope of professional companies, thanks to volunteer labor, widespread community support and the directorship of Gilmor Brown. Notable undertakings of the Pasadena Playhouse include the staging of the entire canon of Shakespeare for the first time on a single stage and a Midsummer Drama Festival showcasing the work of local writers. In 1928, the Playhouse produced the massive theo-philosophical epic Lazarus Laughed by Eugene O'Neill. The first fully realized production of this play, the cast included 250 primarily local amateur actors, often doubling in roles that required more than three hundred masks and costumes.

Little theaters in the 1920s and 1930s
The Little Theatre Movement began in the early 20th century and was a result of young theatre practitioners, dramaturges, stage technicians, stage designers, and actors, who were influenced by European Theatre. More specifically, they were interested in the ideas of Max Reinhardt, a German director, the designing techniques of Adolphe Appia and Gordon Craig, and the staging methods at the Théâtre Libre in Paris, the Freie Bühne in Berlin, and the Moscow Art Theatre.

Seeking larger audiences and with more complicated production ambitions, by the early 1920s, several leading companies of the movement had turned professional. The Provincetown Players, who produced O'Neill's first one-acts, moved to New York in 1916; members of the former Washington Square Players formed the Theatre Guild in 1919; but in its heyday, dozens of Little Theatre groups presented alternatives to mainstream commercial theatre. Numerous small companies had flourished, creating environments for diverse voices and viewpoints, in turn leading to the rise of giants like O'Neill.

The Provincetown Players brought the first important playwright, O'Neill, to fruition. The Provincetown Players were founded in 1915, by three people: Neith Boyce, George Cram Cook, and Susan Glaspell, who undertook Realism, an eccentric form of theatre at the time. O'Neill joined the Provincetown Players in 1916. That summer, Bound East for Cardiff, O'Neill's first play, was performed. Their summer season was so prosperous, the company decided to move to New York. The Provincetown Playhouse in New York City continues to feature up-and-coming playwrights and independently-produced pieces.

Other new little theaters started as community theater groups and university drama programs in the United States and Canada. Theatre Arts Monthly magazine dedicated its July issue from 1924 through the 1930s and beyond to "tributary theatres", its name for little theater programs that acted as tributaries or wellsprings of Broadway, London's West End and other centers of professional theater,. In 1932, Burns Mantle of the Chicago Tribune listed the following non-professional and semi-professional theater companies that were interested in staging new and untried plays: Gilmour Brown's Pasadena Playhouse, Garrett Leverton's Northwestern University group, Syracuse University, the Little Theatre of St. Louis, Frederic McConnell's Playhouse in Cleveland, Western Reserve University, Duluth Little Theater, Dartmouth College, University of Iowa (under the direction of Prof. E. C. Mabie), University of Minnesota, Little Theater of Birmingham, University of Denver (under the direction of Walter Sinclair), Little Theater of Akron, Ohio, Little Theater of El Paso, University of Nebraska, Jasper Deeter's Hedgerow Theater at Moylan Rose Valley, Pennsylvania, the Parrish Players of Stony Creek, Connecticut, and the Little Theater of Dallas, Texas.

Comparable theatres were also established in Canada around the same time: the Arts and Letters Club of Toronto (1908), the Hart House Theatre at the University of Toronto (1919), and the Play Workshop (1934) are all notable examples. As in the United States, many of the playwrights who got their start in these theatres—including Herman Voaden, Merrill Denison, and W.A. Tremayne—went on to anchor early professional theatres.

The July 1939 issue of Theatre Arts Monthly listed the following companies in its "National Little Theatre Directory":

Contemporary effect of the Little Theatre Movement
Little Theatre can be seen as a precursor to the Off-Broadway movement of the 1950s as well as to other smaller, non-commercial ventures thereafter. Today's community theater may be also seen as an outgrowth of the Little Theatre Movement.

Playwrights 
By encouraging freedom of expression, staging the works of talented young writers, and choosing plays solely on the basis of artistic merit, the little theatres provided a valuable early opportunity for such playwrights as Eugene O'Neill, George S. Kaufman, Elmer Rice, Maxwell Anderson and Robert E. Sherwood.

Film 
The 1920s was one of the most critical periods in the United States for the showing of foreign films. Films from several European countries were exhibited throughout the U.S. It is important to note that prior to World War I, many European films were shown in the United States. However, the 1920s was crucial because European films laid down the foundation for the American independent film culture, also known as the Little Theatre Movement.

Several people disliked the American film industry for moral or social dilemmas. The Little Theatre Movement served to oppose Hollywood and the film industry; they dismissed Hollywood's mass production and creation of films to appeal to the largest possible audience.

The Little Theatre Movement's focus was on creating fine art, focused not on commercial purposes, but rather, on artistic, historical, or political content. European films were screened often since there were not a lot of alternatives to major Hollywood productions. These theaters appealed to the upper class and radicals who were isolated from Hollywood. Audience members were encouraged to discuss the films after they were shown.

There was an outstanding increase in Little Theatres that specifically screened European films from 1926 to 1929. The films were believed to be of "perceived artistic superiority to Hollywood Films," which coined the concept of the European Art Film. Eventually, the term "art film" became very loose and society started seeing any film not produced in Hollywood as "art".

The way the term "art film" was used in the United States lead to more critical thinking on film. The Little Theatre Movement gave birth to the Golden Age of the International Art Film (1950–1960s), when directors like Ingmar Bergman, Jean-Luc Godard, and Michelangelo Antonioni became popular in the United States.

See also
 Little Theatre (disambiguation)
 Le Petit Théâtre (disambiguation)
 Little Theatre Guild of Great Britain
 Ainslie Pryor
 Off-Broadway

Notes

External links
 Alice Gerstenberg Papers at Newberry Library

American art
Theatrical genres